Elachista purella is a moth of the family Elachistidae. It is found in Ukraine.

Etymology
The species name is derived from Latin Purus (meaning clean, spotless) and refers to the white and spotless appearance of the moth.

References

purella
Moths described in 2000
Moths of Asia
Moths of Europe